The 2021 Election Committee subsector elections were held on 19 September 2021 for elected seats of the 1,500 members of the Election Committee (EC) which is responsible for electing 40 of the 90 seats in the Legislative Council (LegCo) in the 2021 election and the Chief Executive of Hong Kong (CE) in the 2022 election.

Based on the new electoral framework imposed by the Beijing government, the composition of the Election Committee is drastically changed, seeing its size increasing from 1,200 to 1,500,  with a sizeable number of new seats being nominated and elected by government-appointed and Beijing-controlled organisations, replacing a total number of 117 seats of District Council subsectors which would have been controlled by the pro-democracy camp due to the electoral landslide in the 2019 District Council election. It was widely seen as Beijing's latest move to further curb the influence of the pro-democrats who were able to win more than a quarter of the total seats in the last election in 2016 and its following electoral success in the wake of the widespread anti-government protests of 2019.

Under the new system, the registered voters for the Election Committee dropped by almost 97 per cent, sharply declining from 246,440 voters in 2016 to only 7,891 voters in 2021. Only 13 of the 36 electable subsectors had a contested race, equal to around a quarter of the Election Committee seats involving 412 candidates and about 4,800 eligible voters, while the majority of the seats were either ex officio, nominated by special interest groups or elected uncontestedly. With pro-democrats being purged before the election, the Election Committee was tightly controlled by the pro-Beijing camp with effectively no opposition presence.

Background

2016–2017 electoral cycle
Despite the unique design of the Election Committee (EC) being deeply in favour of the pro-Beijing and pro-business interests, the pro-democrats were able to pocketed more than one-eighth of seats to nominate Civic Party's Alan Leong and Democratic Party's Albert Ho into the Chief Executive race in 2007 and 2012 respectively.

In the 2016 Election Committee Subsector elections, the pro-democrats launched the "Democrats 300+" campaign, aiming at winning more than 300 seats in order to nominate an alternative candidate against incumbent Chief Executive Leung Chun-ying. As a result, the pro-democrats took a record quarter of the seat in the elections, with the help of the landslide victories in the Second Sector of professions, the traditional pro-democracy stronghold, despite Leung Chun-ying announced that he would not seek for a second term two days before the Election Committee elections. The pro-democrats supported former Financial Secretary John Tsang and former judge Woo Kwok-hing against Beijing-favoured Carrie Lam, former Chief Secretary for Administration, making the 2017 Chief Executive election fairly competitive.

2021 NPC electoral reform
In the summer of 2019, the Carrie Lam administration pushed for the extradition bill triggered the unprecedented waves of anti-government protests in the latter half of the year. In the November District Council election, the pro-democrats won a historic electoral landslide by winning more than 80 per cent of the seats, seizing control of 17 of the 18 District Councils as a result. Due to the bloc voting system in the Election Committee, it would mean that the pro-democrats could take all of the 117 seats of the District Council seats in the upcoming Election Committee elections and increase their bargaining power in picking the next Chief Executive.

To thwart opposition momentum and neutralise the pro-democracy movement, the Carrie Lam administration unprecedentedly invoked the Emergency Regulations Ordinance to postpone the September 2020 Legislative Council election, citing the COVID-19 pandemic. In March 2021, the National People's Congress (NPC), China's national legislature, unveiled the plan to drastically rewrite the electoral system for the Chief Executive, the Election Committee and the Legislative Council, claiming the necessity to ensure "patriots governing in Hong Kong" as the basis of further curbing the pro-democracy influence in the coming elections.

New electoral system

Under the amended Annex I of the Basic Law of Hong Kong passed by the National People's Congress Standing Committee (NPCSC) on 30 March 2021, the size of the Election Committee (EC) would be increased from 1,200 to 1,500 seats, with an additional 300-seat Fifth Sector to be added to the existing four sectors of 300 seats each. According to the amendment of the Annex II, the newly elected Election Committee would also be responsible for electing 40 of the 90 seats of the redesigned Legislative Council, shrinking the directly elected seats from 35 to 20 seats.

The seats of the traditional strongholds of the pro-democrats in the Second Sector of professions, including Education and Social Welfare subsectors, would be halved. The original Education and Higher Education subsectors which had 30 seats each would be merged into a 30-seat subsector, while Medical and Health Services subsectors which had 30 seats each would also be merged into a 30-seat subsector. Some of the seats in the other pro-democratic strongholds would also be nominated rather than elected. For instances, half of 30 members of the newly created Technology and Innovation subsector would be nominated from among Hong Kong academicians of the Chinese Academy of Sciences and the Chinese Academy of Engineering; while 15 of the 30-seat Accountancy subsector would be nominated from among Hong Kong accounting advisers appointed by the Chinese Ministry of Finance; nine seats in the Legal subsector would be nominated from the council of the China Law Society. Up to half of the seats from the subsectors of Engineering, Architectural, Surveying, Planning and Landscape, Education, Medical and Health Services, and Social Welfare would be elected by associations instead of individuals.

In the Fourth Sector, all of the 117-seat Hong Kong and Kowloon and New Territories District Councils subsectors on the committee which would be held by the pro-democrats would be eliminated, they would be replaced by "representatives of members of area committees", including members of the government-appointed District Fight Crime Committees and the District Fire Safety Committee of Hong Kong Island, Kowloon and the New Territories who are appointed by the Director of Home Affairs under the Home Affairs Department, as well as representatives of the pro-Beijing associations of Hong Kong residents in the mainland.

Additionally, a new 300-seat Fifth Sector would consist of the 190 seats including the Hong Kong deputies to the National People’s Congress (NPC) and the Hong Kong members of the National Committee of the Chinese People’s Political Consultative Conference (CPPCC), as well as 110 seats comprising representatives of "Hong Kong members of relevant national organisations".

Under the amended annexes, a Candidate Eligibility Review Committee would be set up to vet the qualifications of candidates, based on the approval of the Hong Kong Committee for Safeguarding National Security according to the review by the National Security Department of the Hong Kong Police Force (HKPF) of which its decision would be final and could not be appealed.

Under the new system, the registered voters for the Election Committee dropped by almost 97 per cent, sharply declining from 246,440 voters in 2016 to only 7,891 voters in 2021. The Education subsector remained the largest electorates with 1,725 voters, but was also drastically dropped from more than 80,000 voters in the last election. More than half of the 30 seats would also be held by ex officio members, instead of being directly elected. There were also 404 bodies registered as "grassroots organisations" for the newly created Grassroots Associations subsector, but some entities such as the Modern Mummy Group, Tai Kok Tsui Friends, and the Chinese Arts Papercutting Association were little known to the public, and were reportedly all satellite organisations of the pro-Beijing New Territories Association of Societies.

Nominations
In the nomination period from 6 to 12 August, the Electoral Affairs Commission received a total of 1,016 individual nominations, competing for 967 seats in 36 subsectors. The remaining 533 seats would be nominated by the designated organisations and by ex officio members. Among the 1,016 nominations, 603 of those were returned uncontested. Only 413 candidates who were running in the 13 of the 36 electable subsectors would have a contested race, equal to around a quarter of the Election Committee seats.

On 26 August 2021, Chief Secretary for Administration John Lee, who also chaired the newly established Candidate Eligibility Review Committee, announced that the invalidation of the registration application of the only localist legislators Cheng Chung-tai who was supposedly an ex officio member in the Election Committee. Pierre Chan, the remaining non-establishment legislator along with Cheng, did not register as ex officio member.

As a result, all but two nominated candidates were from the pro-Beijing camp: moderate party Third Side founder Tik Chi-yuen and pro-democracy Sai Kung District Council chairperson Francis Chau. Jason Poon, another moderate construction company owner who blew the whistle on the 2018 MTR Sha Tin to Central Link construction scandal, failed to be nominated through Religious subsector after drawing lots.

Election results

The voting atmosphere in the city was down as 99.9 per cent of Hong Kong voters in legislative election were ineligible to vote in Election Committee elections. The security was tight as the number of deployed police officers outweighed number of voters, about 6,000 police deployed on standby for an election participated by only 4,800 voters.

The election, with the record turnout of 89.77 per cent, was a big win for pro-Beijing camp as expected, winning all but one seats. Tik Chi-yuen was the only non-establishment elected member only after drawing lots due to same number of votes with another candidate. The Democratic Alliance for the Betterment and Progress of Hong Kong (DAB) continued their domination in the camp, claiming to have won more than 150 seats. The Hong Kong Federation of Trade Unions (FTU) ranked the second with 76 seats, and Business and Professionals Alliance for Hong Kong (BPA) coming next with at least 40 seats, while the New People's Party and the Liberal Party said to have 21 and more than 15 seats respectively. As some candidates did not reveal their party affiliation, the numbers from the parties could not be verified.

The vote count soon emerged as controversy for consuming 14 hours although there are only 4,389 ballots, much slower than previous elections. The Electoral Affairs Commission apologised for the clumsiness. Some pro-Beijing politicians and parties, including the Chief Executive, demanded the Commission to explain and review the process.

Results by subsector
Statistics are generated from the official election website:

Results by affiliation

|-
! style="background-color:#E9E9E9;text-align:center;" colspan=3 rowspan=2 |Affiliation
! style="background-color:#E9E9E9;text-align:center;" colspan=2 |1st Sector
! style="background-color:#E9E9E9;text-align:center;" colspan=2 |2nd Sector
! style="background-color:#E9E9E9;text-align:center;" colspan=2 |3rd Sector
! style="background-color:#E9E9E9;text-align:center;" colspan=2 |4th Sector
! style="background-color:#E9E9E9;text-align:center;" colspan=2 |5th Sector
! style="background-color:#E9E9E9;text-align:center;" colspan=2 |Total
|-
! style="background-color:#E9E9E9;text-align:right;" |Standing
! style="background-color:#E9E9E9;text-align:right;" |Elected
! style="background-color:#E9E9E9;text-align:right;" |Standing
! style="background-color:#E9E9E9;text-align:right;" |Elected
! style="background-color:#E9E9E9;text-align:right;" |Standing
! style="background-color:#E9E9E9;text-align:right;" |Elected
! style="background-color:#E9E9E9;text-align:right;" |Standing
! style="background-color:#E9E9E9;text-align:right;" |Elected
! style="background-color:#E9E9E9;text-align:right;" |Standing
! style="background-color:#E9E9E9;text-align:right;" |Elected
! style="background-color:#E9E9E9;text-align:right;" |Standing
! style="background-color:#E9E9E9;text-align:right;" |Elected
|-
| rowspan="13" style="background-color:lightblue" |
| width=1px style="background-color: " |
| style="text-align:left;" |Democratic Alliance for the Betterment and Progress of Hong Kong
| 7 || 7
| 2 || 2
| 9 || 9
| 43 || 42
| 5 || 5
| 66 ||65
|-
| width=1px style="background-color: " |
| style="text-align:left;" |Hong Kong Federation of Trade Unions
| - || -
| - || -
| 50 || 46
| 9 || 9
| 1 || 1
| 60 ||56
|-
| width=1px style="background-color: " |
| style="text-align:left;" |New People's Party/Civil Force
| 3 || 3
| - || -
| - || -
| 7 || 7
| - || -
| 10 ||10
|-
| width=1px style="background-color: " |
| style="text-align:left;" |Federation of Hong Kong and Kowloon Labour Unions
| - || -
| - || -
| 15 || 9
| - || 
| - || -
| 15 || 9
|-
| width=1px style="background-color: " |
| style="text-align:left;" |Liberal Party
| 5 || 5
| - || -
| - || -
| 2 || 2
| - || -
| 7 ||7
|-
| width=1px style="background-color: " |
| style="text-align:left;" |Business and Professionals Alliance for Hong Kong
| - || -
| - || -
| 1 || 1
| 2 || 2
| 3 || 3
| 6 ||6
|-
| width=1px style="background-color: " |
| style="text-align:left;" |Path of Democracy
| - || -
| 2 || 2
| - || -
| - || -
| - || -
| 2 ||2
|-
| width=1px style="background-color: " |
| style="text-align:left;" | Federation of Public Housing Estates
| - || -
| - || -
| - || -
| 2 || 2
| - || -
| 2 ||2
|-
| width=1px style="background-color: #79F31D" |
| style="text-align:left;" | Hong Kong Direct Subsidy Scheme Schools Council
| - || -
| 1 || 1
| - || -
| - || -
| - || -
| 1 || 1
|-
| width=1px style="background-color: " |
| style="text-align:left;" | Hong Kong Federation of Education Workers
| - || -
| 1 || 1
| - || -
| - || -
| - || -
| 1 ||1
|-
| width=1px style="background-color: #B22030" |
| style="text-align:left;" | Hong Kong Senior Government Officers Association
| - || -
| - || -
| 1 || 1
| - || -
| - || -
| 1 || 1
|-
| width=1px style="background-color: #D13634" |
| style="text-align:left;" | Hong Kong Securities & Futures Professionals Association
| 1 || 0
| - || -
| - || -
| - || -
| - || -
| 1 || 0
|-
| width=1px style="background-color:" |
| style="text-align:left;" | Pro-Beijing independents
| 285 || 281
| 162 || 135
| 172 || 170
| 123 || 120
| 102 || 102
| 844 || 808
|- style="background-color:lightblue"
| colspan=3 style="text-align:left;" | Total for pro-Beijing camp
| 301 || 296
| 168 || 141
| 248 ||236
| 187 || 183
| 110 || 110
| 1,014 ||966
|-
|style="background-color:Lightgrey" rowspan="2" |
| width=1px style="background-color: " |
| style="text-align:left;" |Third Side
| - || -
| 1 || 1
| - || -
| - || -
| - || -
| 1 || 1
|-
| width=1px style="background-color:" |
| style="text-align:left;" | Independent democrat
| - || -
| 1 || 0
| - || -
| - || -
| - || -
| 1 || 0
|-
|style="text-align:left;background-color:#E9E9E9" colspan="3"|Total
|style="text-align:right;background-color:#E9E9E9"|301
|style="text-align:right;background-color:#E9E9E9"|296
|style="text-align:right;background-color:#E9E9E9"|170
|style="text-align:right;background-color:#E9E9E9"|142
|style="text-align:right;background-color:#E9E9E9"|248
|style="text-align:right;background-color:#E9E9E9"|236
|style="text-align:right;background-color:#E9E9E9"|187
|style="text-align:right;background-color:#E9E9E9"|183
|style="text-align:right;background-color:#E9E9E9"|110
|style="text-align:right;background-color:#E9E9E9"|110
|style="text-align:right;background-color:#E9E9E9"|1,016
|style="text-align:right;background-color:#E9E9E9"|967
|}
Note: There are two candidates have dual membership of the Democratic Alliance for the Betterment and Progress of Hong Kong (DAB) and the Hong Kong Federation of Trade Unions (FTU).

See also
 2021 Hong Kong legislative election
 2022 Hong Kong Chief Executive election

Notes

References

External links
 2021 Election Committee Subsector Ordinary Elections Official Website

E
E
E
2021 elections in China
E
September 2021 events in China